Rufino de la Cruz Linares (February 28, 1951 – May 16, 1998) was a professional baseball player who played four seasons for the Atlanta Braves and California Angels of Major League Baseball.

Born in San Pedro de Macorís, Dominican Republic, Linares died in an automobile accident in Santo Domingo.

References

1951 births
1998 deaths
Atlanta Braves players
Caimanes del Sur players
California Angels players
Dominican Republic expatriate baseball players in Canada
Dominican Republic expatriate baseball players in the United States
Edmonton Trappers players

Leones del Escogido players
Major League Baseball outfielders
Major League Baseball players from the Dominican Republic
Road incident deaths in the Dominican Republic
Diablos Rojos del México players
Greenwood Braves players
Jacksonville Expos players
Kingsport Braves players
Richmond Braves players
Savannah Braves players